In mathematics, an element a of a commutative ring A is called (relatively) prime to an ideal Q if whenever ab is an element of Q then b is also an element of Q.

A proper ideal Q of a commutative ring A is said to be primal if the elements that are not prime to it form an ideal.

References
.

Commutative algebra